The Nine Courts were nine service agencies in Imperial China that existed from the Northern Qi dynasty (550–577) to the Qing dynasty (1636–1912). Headed by the Nine Chamberlains, the offices were subordinate to the Three Departments and Six Ministries. They were mostly ceremonial in nature and held a fair amount of power. During the Ming dynasty, the heads of the nine court transitioned away from referring to the nine courts, but to the Six Ministries,  the Censorate, the Office of Transmission, and the Grand Court of Revision. The number of courts was not always nine throughout history.

The nine courts throughout most of history were:

See also 
 Five Directorates
 Nine Ministers, related concept

References 

 

Government of Imperial China
 
Government of the Song dynasty
Government of the Tang dynasty
Government of the Yuan dynasty
Government of the Sui dynasty
Government of the Ming dynasty
Government of the Qing dynasty
Government of the Liao dynasty
Government of the Jin dynasty (1115–1234)